Daniel Leroy Baldwin (born October 5, 1960) is an American actor. He is the second oldest of the four Baldwin brothers, all of whom are actors. Baldwin played the role of Detective Beau Felton in the NBC TV series Homicide: Life on the Street, and has also starred in Ned Blessing: The True Story of My Life (1992), Mulholland Falls (1996), Vampires (1998), The Pandora Project (1998), Stealing Candy (2002), Paparazzi (2004) and Grey Gardens (2009).

He hosted The Daniel Baldwin Show on radio station WTLA in Syracuse from 2017 to 2019. He has also been an emcee for the television series truTV Presents: World's Dumbest. In February 2009, he appeared on Celebrity Rehab with Dr. Drew, admitting to his struggle with cocaine addiction.

Early life
Baldwin was born in Massapequa, New York, the second son of Carol Newcomb (née Martineau), a breast cancer survivor who founded the Carol M. Baldwin Breast Care Center of the University Hospital and Medical Center at Stony Brook, and Alexander Rae Baldwin Jr., a high school history/social studies teacher and football coach. Baldwin was raised in a Catholic family and has Irish and French ancestry. In addition to his three actor brothers, Alec (born 1958), William (born 1963), and Stephen (born 1966), Baldwin has two sisters.

Career

Acting
Baldwin's acting debut was in the television film Too Good to Be True in 1988, which he followed with roles in the films Born on the Fourth of July (1989), Harley Davidson and the Marlboro Man (1991) and Hero (1992). He returned to television in 1990 for the short-lived sitcom Sydney, which starred Valerie Bertinelli.

In 1993, Baldwin was cast in the Baltimore-based cop show Homicide: Life on the Street. Although he received good reviews, he left in 1995 after three seasons, and his character was later killed off. He returned to TV movies such as Attack of the 50 Ft. Woman, Family of Cops, and Twisted Desire, as well as the 1996 feature films Mulholland Falls and Trees Lounge.

In 1998, Baldwin was set to film the romantic comedy It Had to Be You, but was replaced by Michael Rispoli after being arrested for cocaine possession. John Carpenter's Vampires was released during his subsequent stint in rehab.

Baldwin was cast as Menelaus in the BBC One show Kings and Pharaohs for Series 1, featuring Christopher Eccleston, Michael Rooker and John Hurt.

Baldwin returned to appearances in various TV series episodes, including The Sopranos; and TV and direct-to-video movies, including reprising his role as Beau Felton in Homicide: The Movie in 2000. Baldwin then starred in TV movies such as Anonymous Rex (2004) and Our Fathers (2005) and small-budget films including Sidekick (2005) and Moola (2006).

In 2008, Baldwin signed on to play Julius Krug in the Award Winning HBO film based on the 1975 documentary Grey Gardens. That same year, he made appearances on truTV's The Smoking Gun Presents: World's Dumbest... as a frequent commentator. He also appeared as a supporting cast member in indie director Akihiro Kitamura's sophomore film, I'll Be There With You.

Baldwin was featured in UniGlobe Entertainment's breast cancer docu-drama titled 1 a Minute in 2010. The documentary was made by actress Namrata Singh Gujral and featured breast cancer survivors Olivia Newton-John, Diahann Carroll, Melissa Etheridge, Namrata Singh Gujral, Mumtaz and Jaclyn Smith, as well as Priya Dutt and Baldwin's brother William. The film also starred Bárbara Mori, Lisa Ray, Deepak Chopra and Morgan Brittany.

2014 saw Baldwin win Best Supporting Actor at the Madrid International Film Festival for his role in the award-winning feature film Helen Alone.

Reality television
In 2005, he was featured in VH1's Celebrity Fit Club, a reality show in which overweight celebrities compete to see who can shed the most weight. He was the team captain of the Eastsiders, which also featured rapper Biz Markie, plus-size model Mia Tyler, and actor Joe Gannascoli (later traded for Judge Mablean Ephriam from Divorce Court).

In 2008, Baldwin appeared on VH1's reality series Celebrity Rehab with Dr. Drew. In June 2009, he joined the cast of I'm a Celebrity... Get Me out of Here!, with his brother Stephen; he was the second person voted off. He has made appearances in several seasons of truTV's The Smoking Gun Presents: World's Dumbest...

In 2014, Baldwin appeared on the first episode of Celebrity Wife Swap. His girlfriend swapped with the wife of Jermaine Jackson.

On August 27, 2015, Baldwin entered the Celebrity Big Brother (also known as Celebrity Big Brother: UK vs USA) house as a contestant representing the USA. On September 4, he was the first housemate evicted; he had lasted nine days.

Personal life

Relationships and family
Baldwin had a daughter, filmmaker Kahlea, with his first wife Cheryl. Baldwin and second wife Elizabeth had a daughter named Alexandra. Following the couple's divorce, Baldwin was involved in a lengthy relationship with his Homicide: Life on the Street co-star, Isabella Hofmann. They have a son, Atticus, born c. 1996, who is named after the lawyer in To Kill a Mockingbird, and has autism. Baldwin next was married to Joanne Smith, a former British model, with whom he had daughter Avis Ann on January 17, 2008. The couple's second child, daughter Finley Rae Martineau Baldwin, was born August 7, 2009 In 2011, Baldwin and his wife announced that they had dropped their divorce filings and were attempting to reconcile. However, in 2012, Joanne filed for divorce again. In November 2014, Baldwin announced his engagement to Robin Sue Hertz Hempel, an entrepreneur.

In June 2017, Baldwin relocated to Cleveland, New York, to be closer to extended family. He joined WTLA in Syracuse in September 2017 and left the station in April 2019, stating that he had accomplished what he wanted to do with the radio show.

Addiction and arrests

In 1998, Baldwin was found running naked through the halls of New York's Plaza Hotel shouting his own last name and was arrested for possession of cocaine. He pleaded guilty to disorderly conduct and was sentenced to three months in drug rehab. He later told People magazine that he had been battling cocaine addiction since 1989.

On April 22, 2006, Baldwin was arrested for possession of drug paraphernalia in a Santa Monica hotel.

He was arrested again on July 19, 2006. According to the police, Baldwin ran a red light after weaving through the traffic in West L.A. just before 1 pm, then crashed his rented Ford Thunderbird into two parked cars while going  in a  zone. Police say Baldwin was driving with a suspended license at the time of the crash. He was transferred to UCLA Medical Center with back and neck injuries but did not appear to be seriously hurt.

On November 7, 2006, Baldwin was arrested in Santa Monica, California, after allegedly stealing a white GMC Yukon SUV. The actor was taken to jail and booked for investigation of grand theft auto; bail was set at $20,000. "The car belongs to an acquaintance of Mr. Baldwin, but he had no permission to take it", said Jim Amormino, a spokesman for the Orange County Sheriff's Department. The charges were subsequently dropped.

On February 6, 2007, an arrest warrant was issued for Baldwin in Newport Beach, California, by the Orange County Superior Court for his failure to show up for an arraignment stemming from an auto-theft charge. 

Baldwin starred on the VH1 reality television show Celebrity Rehab with Dr. Drew, filmed in 2007, but left the show after the fourth episode. His stated reasons for leaving included having a prior commitment to an acting job and the others' behavior interfering with his recovery. It was eventually reported that he left because of inappropriate text messages he had sent to Mary Carey, a fellow patient in his treatment group.

Filmography

Film

Television

Director

Notes

References

External links

1960 births
Male actors from New York (state)
American male film actors
American male television actors
American people of French descent
American people of Irish descent
Living people
Participants in American reality television series
People from Massapequa, New York
People from Lake Oswego, Oregon
Daniel
People from Bonita Springs, Florida
Berner High School alumni